George Heslop (1 July 1940 – 17 September 2006) was an English footballer.

Heslop was a centre half who played for Newcastle United and Everton, before a successful spell at Manchester City between 1965 and 1971, where he made a total of 197 (plus six as substitute) first team appearances scoring three goals. He was an integral member of the team that won the Second Division title (1965/66 season), League Championship, 1968 FA Charity Shield, League Cup and the European Cup Winners' Cup. He later played in Cape Town and for Bury.

In retirement, he managed Northwich Victoria for a spell, before becoming landlord of the City Gates public house on Hyde Road. The City Gates was the original Hyde Road Hotel, the location where Ardwick became Manchester City F.C. The venture failed and closed in 1988. Stones from the building currently form part of City's memorial garden at the City of Manchester Stadium.

He died in September 2006 following a short illness.

References

External links
 

1940 births
2006 deaths
Sportspeople from Wallsend
Footballers from Tyne and Wear
English footballers
Association football central defenders
Newcastle United F.C. players
Everton F.C. players
Manchester City F.C. players
Cape Town City F.C. (NFL) players
Bury F.C. players
Macclesfield Town F.C. players
English Football League players
English football managers
Northwich Victoria F.C. managers
Bury F.C. non-playing staff
National Football League (South Africa) players